The 1961 Yale Bulldogs football team represented Yale University in the 1961 NCAA University Division football season.  The Bulldogs were led by tenth-year head coach Jordan Olivar, played their home games at the Yale Bowl and finished fifth in the Ivy League with a 3–4 record, 4–5 overall.

Schedule

References

Yale
Yale Bulldogs football seasons
Yale Bulldogs football